The Upsilon Sigma Phi is the oldest Greek-letter organization and fraternity in Asia. It is the first student organization in the University of the Philippines, and it has been in operation since its founding in 1918. The following is a list of notable members of Upsilon Sigma Phi, the oldest Greek-letter fraternity in Asia.

Constitutional Conventions

1935 Constitutional Convention 

Conrado Benitez - Delegate, Laguna
Jose P. Laurel - Delegate, Batangas
Wenceslao Vinzons - Delegate, Camarines Norte

1971 Constitutional Convention 

Sotero Laurel - President Pro-Tempore
Domocao Alonto - Delegate, Lanao del Sur
Enrique Belo - Delegate, First District of Capiz
Mateo A.T. Caparas – Delegate, First District of Bulacan
Estanislao Fernandez - Delegate, Second District of Laguna
Richard J. Gordon - Delegate, Zambales
Augusto Legaspi - Delegate, Lone District of Aklan
Juan R. Liwag - Delegate, Second District of Nueva Ecija
Tocod Macaraya – Delegate, Lanao del Sur
Ceferino Padua - Delegate, First District of Rizal
Juanito Remulla Sr. - Delegate, Cavite
Jose E. Suarez - Delegate, First District of Pampanga
Jose Yulo, Jr. - Delegate, First District of Laguna

1987 Constitutional Commission  
Domocao Alonto - Assistant Floor Leader
Yusuf R. Abubakar - Commissioner
Jose B. Laurel, Jr. - Commissioner 
Christian Monsod - Commissioner
Jose Suarez - Commissioner

Executive Branch

Presidents 
Ferdinand Marcos – 10th Philippine President, 11th Senate President, Secretary of Defense, and Ilocos Norte Representative
José P. Laurel – 4th Philippine President, Senator, Supreme Court Justice, Commissioner of Justice, and Secretary of the Interior; Member, 1935 Constitutional Convention
José Abad Santos – Acting President of the Philippines, Chief Justice of the Supreme Court

Vice Presidents 

 Salvador Laurel – Philippine Vice President, Prime Minister, Senator, and Secretary of Foreign Affair

Executive Departments

Current 

 Jesus Melchor Quitain - OIC, Office of the Special Assistant to the President
 Jing Paras - Presidential Legislative Assistant, Presidential Legislative Liaison Office
 Ted Herbosa - special adviser to the National Task Force on COVID-19
 Nicholas Ty - Assistant Secretary, Department of Justice
 Michel Kristian R. Ablan - Undersecretary, Presidential Communications Operations Office
 Avelino Tolentino - Assistant Secretary, Housing and Urban Development Coordinating Council (HUDCC)

Former 
Estelito Mendoza – Solicitor General; Minister of Justice
Ricardo P. Galvez – Solicitor General
Juan R. Liwag –  Solicitor General; Secretary of Justice
Querube Makalintal – Solicitor General
Salvador P. Lopez – Secretary, Foreign Affairs
Onofre Corpuz – Secretary, Department of Education; Chairperson, Career Executive Service Board
Dante Canlas – Secretary of Economic Planning; Director, National Economic Development Council (NEDA)
Catalino Macaraig Jr. – Executive Secretary, Office of the President
 Ponciano G. A. Mathay – Executive Secretary
 Dionisio dela Serna – Deputy Executive Secretary
 Juan Lorenzo Tañada - Deputy Commissioner, Bureau of Customs
 Rico Puno - Undersecretary, Department of Interior and Local Government
 Emilio Espinosa – Secretary of Labor
 Enrique M. Garcia – Secretary of Health
 Pio Pedrosa – Secretary of Finance
 Teodoro Peña – Minister of Natural Resources
 Troadio Quiazon – Secretary of Commerce and Industry

Legislative Branch

Senate

Incumbent 
Richard Gordon – Senator (2004–2010; 2016–Present)
Francis Pangilinan – Senator (2001–2013; 2016–Present), Majority Floor Leader (2004-2008)

Former 
Benigno Aquino Jr. – Senator (1967–1972), Marcos opposition leader 
Joker Arroyo – Senator (2001–2013)
Gil Puyat – 13th Senate President (1967-1972), Senator (1951–1972) 
Gerry Roxas – Senator (1963–1972), Senate Minority Floor Leader
Juan Liwag – Senator (1963–1969) and Justice Secretary
Mamintal A.J. Tamano – Senator (1969–1972, 1987–1992)
Domocao Alonto – Senator (1956–1961), Islamic leader
Sotero Laurel – President Pro Tempore (1991-1992), Senator (1987–1992)
Estanislao Fernandez – Senator (1959–1965), Senate Minority Floor Leader (1962-1965)
Jose P. Laurel – Senator (1925–1931; 1951-1957); Majority Leader (1928–1931)
Arturo Tolentino – Senator (1957–1972; 1992–1995)
Salvador Laurel  – Senator (1967–1972)
Ferdinand Marcos  – 11th Senate President (1963-1965), Senator (1959–1965)

House of Representatives

Incumbent 
Martin Romualdez – Leyte Representative  (2007–2016; 2019–Present); Majority Floor Leader (2019–Present)
Jesus Crispin Remulla – Cavite Representative (2004–2013; 2019–Present)
Isagani Amatong – Zamboanga del Norte Representative (2019–Present)
Rimpy Bondoc – Pampanga Representative (2019–Present)
Arnulf Bryan Fuentebella – Camarines Sur Representative (2019–Present)
Roman Romulo – Pasig Representative (2007–2016; 2019–Present)
Victor Yap – Tarlac Representative (2019–Present)
Alfred Vargas – Quezon City 5th District Representative (2013–Present)

Former 
José Laurel Jr. – 9th Speaker of the House of Representatives; Batangas Representative (1941-1957; 1961-1972; 1984-1986)  
Nicanor Yñiguez – 15th Speaker of the House of Representatives; Southern Leyte Representative (1957–1972; 1984–1986) 
Roque Ablan, Jr. – Ilocos Norte Representative (1967–1973; 1987–1998; 2001–2010)
Felix William Fuentebella – Camarines Sur Representative (2001–2004; 2013–2016) 
Gerardo Roxas Jr. – Capiz Representative (1987–1993)
Wenceslao Vinzons – Camarines Norte Representative (1941–1942)
Gilbert Remulla – Cavite Representative (2001–2004)
 Simeon M. Valdez - Ilocos Norte Representative
 Hermogenes D. Concepcion, Jr. - Nueva Ecija Representative
 Renato P. Dragon - Cavite Representative
 Emilio R. Espinosa - Masbate Representative
 Francisco B. Aniag, Jr. - Bulacan Representative
 Joaquin L. Ortega, Jr. - La Union Representative
 Samuel F. Reyes - Ilocos Sur Representative
 Florante C. Roque - Bulacan Representative
 Jerome V. Paras - Negros Oriental Representative
 Jacinto V. Paras - Negros Oriental Representative
 Marcial C. Punzalan, Jr. - Quezon Representative
 Pablo R. Roman - Bataan Representative
 Agaton A. Ursua - Camarines Sur Representative
 Eduardo C. Zialcita - Parañaque City Representative
 Enrique A. Zaldivar - Antique Representative
Joker P. Arroyo - Makati City Representative
 Gerardo Roxas, Sr. - Capiz Representative
 Ferdinand E. Marcos - Ilocos Norte Representative

Batasang Pambansa 

Ismael A. Mathay, Jr. - Quezon City Representative
 Enrique M. Belo - Western Visayas Representative
 Angel D. Concepcion - Central Luzon Representative
 Onofre D. Corpuz - Cabinet Representative
 Enrique T. Garcia - Cabinet Representative
 Mario S. Garcia - Central Luzon Representative
 Querube C. Makalintal - Metro Manila Representative
 Estelito P. Mendoza - Central Luzon Representative
 Jose G. Puyat, Jr. - Surigao del Sur Representative
 Teodoro Q. Peña - Southern Tagalog Representative
 Troadio T. Quiazon, Jr. - Cabinet Representative
 Arturo M. Tolentino - Manila Representative
 Danilo L. Concepcion - Sectoral: Youth Representative
 Salvador H. Laurel - Southern Tagalog Representative
 Juan R. Liwag - Central Luzon Representative
 Estanislao A. Fernandez - Laguna Representative

National Assembly 

Teodoro M. Kalaw, Sr.

Judicial Branch

Supreme Court Chief Justices 
José Abad Santos – 5th Chief Justice of the Supreme Court of the Philippines; Secretary of Justice
Jose P. Laurel – Acting Chief Justice, Supreme Court of the Philippines; Associate Justice, Supreme Court of the Philippines
Querube Makalintal – 11th Chief Justice of the Supreme Court of the Philippines; 14th Speaker of the House of Representatives
Enrique Fernando – 13th Chief Justice of the Supreme Court of the Philippines

Supreme Court Associate Justices 
Estanislao Fernandez – Associate Justice, Supreme Court of the Philippines
Nestor Alampay – Associate Justice, Supreme Court of the Philippines 
Ramon Fernandez – Associate Justice, Supreme Court of the Philippines 
Vicente Ericta – Associate Justice, Supreme Court of the Philippines
Hermogenes Concepcion – Associate Justice, Supreme Court of the Philippines 
Emilio Gancayco – Associate Justice, Supreme Court of the Philippines
Jose Campos – Associate Justice, Supreme Court of the Philippines 
Camilo Quiason – Associate Justice, Supreme Court of the Philippines
Florentino Feliciano – Associate Justice, Supreme Court of the Philippines
Josue Bellosillo – Associate Justice, Supreme Court of the Philippines

Local Government Units

Incumbent Governors 

Juanito Victor "Jonvic" Remulla – Cavite Governor (2010–2016; 2019–present)
Dennis Socrates – Vice Governor, Palawan
Vincent Soriano – Mayor, Pakil, Laguna (2016–present); Laguna Board Member (2001-2004)
Jovi Fuentabella – Mayor, Camarines Sur
Jay Rodriguez – Board Member, Palawan
Ping Remulla – Board Member, Cavite
Zaldy Laudencia – Councilor, La Union
Jay Quitain Jr. – Councilor, Davao City
Rhichie Brown – Councilor, Pasig
Cocoy Lopez – Councilor, Laguna

Former Governors 
Wenceslao Q. Vinzons – World War II war hero; Camarines Norte Governor (1940–1941); Member, 1935 Constitutional Convention
Benigno Aquino Jr. – Governor, Tarlac (1961–1967)
Juanito Remulla Sr. – Governor, Cavite (1980–1986; 1987–1995)
Jesus Crispin "Boying" Remulla – Governor, Cavite (2016–2019)
 Wencelito T. Andanar - Governor, Surigao del Norte
 Madki A. G. Alonto - Governor, Lanao del Sur
 Isagani S. Amatong - Governor, Zamboanga del Norte
 Jack P. Arroyo - Governor, Camarines Sur
 Vicente Caedo - Governor, Batangas
 Emilio R. Espinosa, Jr. - Governor, Masbate
 Augusto B. Legaspi, Sr. - Governor, Aklan
 Estelito P. Mendoza - Governor, Pampanga
 Joaquin L. Ortega, Jr. - Governor, La Union
 Efren B. Pascual - Governor, Bataan
 Manuel S. Pecson - Governor, Masbate
 Victor A. Yap - Governor, Tarlac
 Enrique A. Zaldivar - Governor, Antique
Mel Mathay – Mayor, Quezon City (1992-2001)
Teddy Macapagal - Mayor, Olongapo City; Founder, PDP–Laban
Felixberto Oliveros – Mayor, Puerto Princesa

Foreign Service

Current 
 Jaime Victor B. Ledda - Ambassador to the Netherlands (2013-2020); former Permanent Representative to the Organization for the Prohibition of Chemical Weapons (OPCW)
 Carlos D. Sorreta - Ambassador to Russia (2015-2021); former Director-General of the Foreign Service Institute

Former 
Roberto S. Benedicto - Ambassador to Japan (1972-1978); First Class, Order of the Rising Sun (1977)
 Jose S. Alejandrino - Ambassador to France (1963-1969)
 Mario C. Belisario - Ambassador to Romania and Hungary (1981-1986); Consul General for Chicago, USA (1989-1990)
 Gautier F. Bisnar - Ambassador and Chief Delegate to the Malaysian-Philippine Talks on Sabah (1968); Consul General for Vancouver, Canada (1968-1971)
 Jose D. Ingles - first Philippine Ambassador to the Federal Republic of Germany (1956-1962); Ambassador to Thailand (1962-1965)
 Yusuf R. Abubakar - first Ambassador to Malaysia; Ambassador to Egypt (1971-1973)
 Trinidad Q. Alconcel - Ambassador to Argentina (1984-1986); Consul General for Hawaii (1966-1972; 1976-1984)
 Madki A. G. Alonto - former Ambassador to Libya
 Constante Ma. Cruz - Ambassador to Myanmar (1978-1986)
 Abraham A. Rasul - Ambassador to Saudi Arabia (1989-1993)
 Jose Z. Oledan - Ambassador to Spain (1999-2001)
 Armando D. Manalo - Ambassador to Belgium and Luxembourg (1979-1985); Ambassador to Switzerland (1985-1986)
 Isabelito Astraquillo - Ambassador to the United Arab Emirates (1986-1989)
 Kasan A. Marohombsar - Ambassador to Egypt (1986-1993)
 Alberto A. Pedrosa - Ambassador to Belgium (1993-1995)
 Edgardo B. Espiritu - Ambassador to the United Kingdom (2003-2009)
 Enrique Zaldivar - Ambassador to Brunei (1999-2002)
 Alunan C. Glang - Ambassador to Kuwait (1987-1989)
 Menandro P. Galenzoga - Ambassador to Egypt (1993-1996)
 Oscar G. Valenzuela - Ambassador to Brazil (1999-2005), Ambassador to Egypt (2008-2010)
 Willy C. Gaa - Ambassador to the United States (2006-2010); Ambassador to the People's Republic of China (2003-2006)
 Jesus I. Yabes - Ambassador to Pakistan (2010-2012); Ambassador to Singapore (1999-2002); Consul General for Shanghai, China (2002-2007)
 Jose Arthur P. Ampeso - Consul General for Vancouver, Canada (2011-2013); Charges d’ Affaires of the Embassy in United Arab Emirates (2002-2003)
 Wencelito T. Andanar - special envoy to Malaysia
 Julius D. Torres - Charges d'Affaires of the Embassy in Iraq; Ambassador to Jordan (2008-2011); Consul General, Hawaii (2011-2014)

Military and Law Enforcement 
 Gregorio Pio Catapang – Chief of Staff, Armed Forces of the Philippines (AFP)
 Jolly R. Bugarin – Director, National Bureau of Investigation (NBI); President, International Criminal Police Organization (Interpol)
 Peter Suchianco - Brigadier General, Armed Forces of the Philippines (RES)
 Florencio Magsino - Superintendent of the Philippine Military Academy; Head, National Defense College; Alumnus, United States Military Academy
 Carlos C. Aguilar - Brigadier General, AFP
 Jaime M. Alfonso - Brigadier General, AFP
 Paolo Leo Ma. G. Miciano - Brigadier General, AFP
 Rene R. Cruz - Brigadier General, Philippine National Police

Independent Offices & Government-Owned and Controlled Corporations 
 Michael Ted R. Macapagal - Director, Philippine National Oil Corporation; Olongapo City President, PDP–Laban (Duterte administration)
 Patrick Ty – Chief Regulator, Metropolitan Waterworks and Sewerage System (MWSS) Regulatory Office
 Alfonso Calalang – Governor, Central Bank of the Philippines
 Roberto S. Benedicto - Monetary Board Member
 Jaime Velasquez - Monetary Board Member
 Pio Pedrosa - Monetary Board Member
Christian Monsod – COMELEC Chairman; Commissioner, 1987 Constitutional Commission
Vicente Ericta - Ombudsman of the Philippines
Bartolome C. Fernandez, Jr. - Commissioner, Commission on Audit
 Ramoncito Z. Abad – Chairman, Development Bank of the Philippines
 Nereo C. Andolong – Chairman & General Manager, Philippine Charity Sweepstakes Office
 Hermogenes D. Concepcion, Jr. – Chairman, Government Service Insurance System
 Deogracias Gerard P. Custodio – Chairman & Administrator, Authority of the Freeport Area of Bataan (AFAB)
 Saeed Daof – Chairman, Southern Philippines Development Authority
 Ricardo G. Golpeo - Chairman, Philippine Charity Sweepstakes Office
 Jose R. Katigbak - Chairman, Land Bank of the Philippines
 Sergio T. Naguiat, Jr. – President, Clark Development Corporation
 Federico C. Pascual - President, Government Service Insurance System
 Pio P. Pedrosa - President, Philippine National Bank
 Teodoro Q. Peña - Chairperson, Export Processing Zone Authority 
 Vicente U. Quintana - Administrator, Cooperatives Development Authority
 Rodolfo O. Reyes – Administrator & CEO, Cagayan Economic Zone Authority (CEZA)

International Organizations 

 Salvador P. Lopez - Chairman of the United Nations Commission on Human Rights
Jolly R. Bugarin – only Filipino elected as President, International Criminal Police Organization (Interpol)
 Mateo A. T. Caparas - only Filipino elected as President of Rotary International
 Florentino P. Feliciano - Chairman of the Appellate Body of the World Trade Organization

Academe

University of the Philippines 
Danilo Concepcion – 21st President, University of the Philippines; Dean, UP College of Law; Commissioner, Securities and Exchange Commission (Philippines); President, Gregorio Araneta University Foundation
Alfredo Pascual – 20th President, University of the Philippines
Onofre Corpuz – Order of National Scientists, Political Economy and Government; 13th President, University of the Philippines 
Salvador P. Lopez – 12th President, University of the Philippines 
Enrique T. Virata – 9th President, University of the Philippines
Jose Encarnacion, Jr. – Dean, UP School of Economics; Order of National Scientists, Economics;
Amado Castro - first Dean of the UP School of Economics
Serafin Quiason, Jr. – Professor of History, Chairman, National Historical Institute

Others
Teodoro Kalaw – Father of the Philippine Library System
Carmelino Alvendia Sr. – Associate Justice, Court of Appeals; Founder, Quezon City Academy
Jose P. Laurel - Founder and President, Lyceum of the Philippines, Chancellor, Quezon Colleges
Sotero Laurel - President, Lyceum of Batangas; Chairman, Lyceum of the Philippines University
Joseph Emmanuelle Angeles – President, Angeles University Foundation
Leonides Bautista - Chairman, University of Baguio
Conrado Benitez - Co-Founder, Philippine Women's University
Mario D. Camacho - President, University of Asia and the Pacific
Ernesto de Castro - Chancellor, University of the East
Jose Ingles - Dean, College of Foreign Service, Lyceum of the Philippines
Cesar H. Concio - Dean, College of Architecture, Mapua Institute of Technology; First University Architect of the University of the Philippines who designed the Palma, Melchor, and Vinzons Halls, the UP Protestant Chapel
Tocod Macaraya - OIC President, Mindanao State University
Rodolfo Nayga - President, Isabela State University
Ferdinand Nicolas - President, Northwestern University
Victor Perez - President, Cagayan College
Hermenegildo Reyes - President, Central Colleges of the Philippines
Domingo Santiago, Jr. - Chairman and President, Baliuag University, Bulacan

Arts & Humanities 
Kidlat Tahimik – National Artist of the Philippines for Film; Father of Philippine Independent Filmmaking; Founder, AIESEC in the Philippines
Pitoy Moreno – Fashion Czar of Asia
Johnny Alegre – World-renowned jazzist
Behn Cervantes – Film director/actor; Founder, UP Repertory Company
Tony Mabesa – National Artist of the Philippines for Theater, actor, director, pioneer of Philippine university theater
Gémino Abad – National Artist of the Philippines for Literature, literary critic, poet
Martin del Rosario – Filipino actor
Alexander Cortez – Director and stage actor; Managing Director of Dulaang UP
Serafin Quiason, Jr. – Historian and Chairman, National Historical Institute
Mike Sandejas - Film Director
Conrado Ong - Aliw Awards Hall of Fame, Best Classical Performer (Male) Award in 2009, 2011, and 2014

Business & Corporate 
Jorge L. Araneta – Philippine billionaire; Chairman, Araneta Group of Companies
Roberto Benedicto – Philippine billionaire; Business magnate (sugar, media, real estate, aviation, agriculture)
 Norberto B. Quisumbing, Jr. - businessman and founder of Norkis Trading and Norkis Group of Companies
 Fernando Malveda - Chairman and President, LEADS Agricultural and Environmental Health Products Corp.
 Dante M. Abando - President, Makati Development Corporation; Vice President, Ayala Land, First Vice President, Philippine Constructors Association; President, Alveo Land
 Ari Chio - Vice President for Investor Relations, GMA 7
 Jose Ejercito - Chairman of the Board, Unilever Korea
 Denis Lucindo - Vice President for Business Development, Philex Mining
 Manuel Ortega - Vice President for External Affairs, Philamlife
 Jaime Velasquez - Director, Ayala y Compania; Vice President & Director, Ayala Securities Corporation; Chairman, Ayala Investment and Development Corporation
 Jose Puyat, Jr. - President, Philippine Chamber of Wood Industries
 Ramon Abad - Chairman, Development Bank of the Philippines
 Arsenio Bartolome III - President, Philippine National Bank; Chairman, Urban Bank
 Alfonso Calalang - President, Security Bank & Trust Company; President, Bankers Association of the Philippines
 Jose Desiderio, Jr. - President, Rural Bankers Association of the Philippines
 Jose Katigbak - Chairman, Land Bank of the Philippines; Chairman and President, Union Savings and Mortgage Bank
 Romeo Liamzon - President, Rural Bankers Association of the Philippines
 Ramon Melencio - President, Rural Bankers Association of the Philippines
 Edgardo Espiritu - President, Philippine National Bank, Associated Bank, and Westmont Bank
 Federico Pascual - President, Allied Bank
 Carlos Pedrosa - President, Pilipinas Bank
 Pio Pedrosa - President, Philippine National Bank; President, Prudential Bank and Trust Company
 Gil Puyat - Chairman and President, Manila Banking Corporation
 Vicente G. Puyat - President, Rural Bankers Association of the Philippines
 Jaime Velasquez - Chairman, Bank of the Philippine Islands

Journalism & Mass Communication 

 Raul Palabrica - Chair, Philippine Daily Inquirer
 Martin Romualdez - Owner, Manila Standard; Owner, People's Journal
 Jake Almeda Lopez - General Manager and Vice Chairman, ABS-CBN
 Anthony Pangilinan - Host, CNN Philippines' The Boardroom; first Filipino to serve as AIESEC International President (PAI)
 Antonio Quirino – Father of Philippine Television; founder of the first television station in the Philippines: Alto Broadcasting System (now part of ABS-CBN)
 Conrado Benitez – Father of Philippine Journalism in English 
Angelo Castro Jr. – ABS-CBN News anchor
Armando Malay - Journalist and activist; honored at the Bantayog ng mga Bayani

Law 
 Enrique Quiason - 2019 Top 100 Lawyers, Asia Business Law Journal; Founding Partner, Quiason Makalintal Barot Torres Ibarra Sison & Damaso
 Ancheta Tan - 2019 Top 100 Lawyers, Asia Business Law Journal; Founding Partner, Castillo Laman Tan Pantaleon & San Jose; titular member, International Labor Organization's Governing Body
 Carlos Ocampo - 2019 Top 100 Lawyers, Asia Business Law Journal;  Founding Partner, Ocampo & Manalo Law Firm (OMLAW)
 Manolito Manalo - 2019 Top 100 Lawyers, Asia Business Law Journal; Founding Partner, Ocampo & Manalo Law Firm (OMLAW); Chairman, CEO, Prime Media Holdings Corp.
 Mark Gutierrez - 2019 Top 100 Lawyers, Asia Business Law Journal; Founding Partner, Gatmaytan Yap Patacsil Gutierrez & Protacio Law (C&G Law)
Estelito Mendoza - Partner, Estelito P. Mendoza & Associates
Nicholas Felix Ty - Founding Partner, Molo, Sia, Dy, Tuazon, Ty & Coloma (MOSVELDTT) Law Offices
David Emmanuel Puyat - Founding Partner, Puyat Jacinto & Santos (PJS)
Chet Tan, Jr. - Partner, Castillo Laman Tan Pantaleon & San Jose
Rodolfo Reyes - Partner, Gordon Reyes Buted Viado & Blanco Law Offices (GDR Law)
Caesar Augustus Blanco - Partner, Gordon Reyes Buted Viado & Blanco Law Offices (GDR Law)
Juan Orendain Buted - Partner, Gordon Reyes Buted Viado & Blanco Law Offices (GDR Law)
Jose Crisostomo, Jr. - Senior Partner, Siguion Reyna Montecillo & Ongsiako (SRMO)

Medicine 
 Nicanor D. Montoya Sr. - Chairman and Founder, Medicard Philippines
 Nicanor Montoya, Jr. - President, Medicard Philippines
 Augusto Sarmiento - Chairman Emeritus, The Medical City
 Calixto H. Zaldivar – Director, Lung Center of the Philippines
 Ramon Batungbacal - President, Philippine Society of Ophthalmology; Professor Emeritus, UE Ramon Magsaysay Memorial Medical Center (UERM)
 Alfredo Ramirez - Father of Burn Medicine in the Philippines; Dean, UP College of Medicine; President, Philippine College of Surgeons
 Albert Francis E. Domingo - Consultant for Noncommunicable Diseases and Health Promotion, WHO Regional Office for the Western Pacific
 Antonio B. Donesa – President, University of the Philippines Medical Alumni Society in America, 1985-1987
 Enrique Garcia – Health Minister; Director, Quezon Institute
 Teodoro Herbosa – Undersecretary, Department of Health
 Higino C. Laureta – TOYM Medicine 1968
 Rodolfo L. Nitollama – President, Philippine Orthopaedic Association, 2004
 Fernando F. Piedad – President, Philippine College of Physicians, first Asian Executive Committee Member, International Society of Internal Medicine
 Victor R. Potenciano – Founder and Chairman, Polymedic (now the Victor R. Potenciano Memorial Medical Center)
 Deogracias A.G. Reyes – Director, Center for Advanced Skills, Simulation and Training Innovation (Medical City)
 Salvador R. Salceda – Director, Philippine General Hospital
 Manuel Carlos Tan, Jr. – President, Philippine Society of Otorhinolaryngology; ASEAN Federation of ENT Societies

Muslim Rights Advocacy 

 Ahmad Domocao Alonto - King Faisal Foundation Awardee for Service to Islam; Founding Member of the Makkah-based Rabita Al-Alam Al-Islami - Muslim World League; Chairman, Jamiatul Philippine as Islamia
 Serapion "Saeed Ali" Daof - Chairman/Executive Director, Center for the Promotion of Peace and Development in Mindanao; Ambassador, Moro Islamic Liberation Front
 Alunan Glang - Ambassador; Leadership in Social and Cultural Development 1969
 Abraham Rasul
 Mamintal A.J. Tamano
 Madki Alonto

Science, Technology & Engineering 
Jose Encarnacion, Jr. – Order of National Scientists, Economics; Dean, UP School of Economics
Romulo Davide - National Academy of Science and Technology, Nematology/Plant Pathology
Jose Juliano - National Academy of Science and Technology, Nuclear Chemistry and Physics
Roman Kintanar – Filipino meteorologist; President, World Meteorological Organization (WMO)
Ricardo Lantican - Order of National Scientists, Plant Breeding
Bienvenido O. Juliano - Order of National Scientists, Organic Chemistry
Faustino T. Orillo - National Academy of Science and Technology, Mycology
Ruben L. Villareal - National Academy of Science and Technology, Horticulture
Claudio B. Altura - Founder, TCGI Engineering, SKI Construction Group Inc.,  Construction Project Management Association of the Philippines (CPMAP), and PHILKOEI International, Inc.

Sports 
Chito Salud – President/CEO/Commissioner, Philippine Basketball Association
Raphael Matthew Chua – Olympic medalist
Col. Nereo Andolong - Philippine Olympic Committee President, 1977-1980
Gen. Rene R. Cruz - Philippine Olympic Committee President, 1993-1996
Gregorio Pio Catapang - Functional Area Director for Games Security and Safety, 30th SEA Games

Distinguished Honorees/Awardees

Bantayog ng mga Bayani 
Benigno S. Aquino, Jr. - Senator, Marcos opposition leader
Merardo Arce - Commander, New People's Army
Melito Glor - Commander, New People's Army
Behn Cervantes - Artist, activist
Cesar E. Hicaro - Student activist
Armando Malay - Journalist, activist 
Alfredo L. Malicay - Student activist

The Outstanding Filipino (TOFIL) Award 

 Edgardo Espiritu (1988 - Banking)
 Armando Malay (1994 - Journalism/Human Rights)
 Christian Monsod (1995 - Government Service)
 Salvador H. Laurel (1996 - Public Service)
 Richard J. Gordon (1996 - Government Service)
 Mateo Armando T. Caparas (1999 - Community Service)

The Outstanding Young Men (TOYM) Awardees 
 Jose O. Juliano (1959 - Science)
 Benigno S. Aquino, Jr. (1960 - Public Service)
 Florentino P. Feliciano (1961 - Law)
 Jorge G. Davide (1962 - Soils Science)
 Jose Encarnacion, Jr. (1963 - Economics)
 Abelardo G. Samonte (1963 - Public Administration)
 Bienvenido O. Juliano (1964 - Science)
 Rodolfo Y. Ragodon (1964 - Arts Painting)
 Serafin D. Quiason, Jr. (1965 - History)
 Fernando A. Bernardo (1966 - Plant Breeding and Genetics)
 Jose P. Enriquez (1966 - Humanitarian Service)
 Ricardo M. Lantican (1968 - Agriculture)
 Higino C. Laureta (1968 - Medicine)
 Alunan C. Glang (1969 - Leadership in Social and Cultural Development)
 Edwin G. Wagelie (1969 - Animal Science)
 Ruben L. Villareal (1971 - Plant Breeding)
 Virgilio R. Carangal (1973 - Agriculture)
 Alfredo T. Ramirez (1973 - Medicine)
 Christian S. Monsod (1975 - Finance)
 Leovillo C. Agustin (1979 - Law Practice/Legal Aid)
 Arsenio M. Bartolome III (1980 - Development Banking)
 Richard Gordon (1982 - Public Administration)
 Ivan Anthony S. Henares (2012 - Heritage Conservation)
 Alfred Vargas (2019 - Public Service)
 Ariestelo A. Asilo (2021 - Social Entrepreneurship)

Ten Outstanding Students of the Philippines 

 Benjo A. Delarmente (2008)
 Sean Vincent L. Aquilino (2011)
 Juan Carlo P. Tejano (2012)
 Lancelot C. Yupingkun (2014)
 Raphael Aaron A. Letaba (2015)

References 

Lists of people by activity
List of